Ryan William Sylvester (born 20 April 1975) is a Welsh cricketer.  Sylvester is a right-handed batsman who bowls leg break.  He was born at Cardiff, Glamorgan.

Sylvester made his debut in the Minor Counties Championship for Herefordshire in 1998, playing just a single match for them against Oxfordshire.  The following season he joined Wales Minor Counties, making his Minor Counties Championship debut for them against Cornwall.  From 1999 to 2002, he represented the team in 21 Championship matches, the last of which came against Cornwall.  His MCCA Knockout Trophy debut for the team came in 1999 against Herefordshire.  From 1999 to 2001, Sylvester represented the team in 7 Trophy matches, the last of which came against the Warwickshire Cricket Board.

His debut List A appearance for the team came in the 1st round of the 1999 NatWest Trophy against Lincolnshire.  From 1999 to 2002, he represented the team in 12 List A matches, the last of which came against Cornwall in the 2nd round of the 2003 Cheltenham & Gloucester Trophy which was played in 2002.  In his 12 List A matches, he scored 294 runs at a batting average of 29.40, with three half centuries and a high score of 73.

Sylvester previously played Second XI cricket for the Glamorgan Second XI and Gloucestershire Second XI.  He currently plays club cricket for Sully Centurions Cricket Club in the South Wales Cricket League.

References

External links
Ryan Sylvester at Cricinfo
Ryan Sylvester at CricketArchive

1975 births
Living people
Cricketers from Cardiff
Welsh cricketers
Herefordshire cricketers
Wales National County cricketers